The Ambassador from Israel to Tanzania was Israel's foremost diplomatic representative in Tanzania.

List of Former Ambassadors

Oded Joseph (Non-Resident, Nairobi) 2019 - 
Noah Gal Gendler (Non-Resident, Nairobi) 2017 - 2019
Jacob Keidar (Non-Resident, Nairobi) 2007 - 2011
Yitzhak Pundak November 1965 until ?

Former Ambassadors - Tanganiyika
Rafael Ruppin 1962

References 

Tanzania
Israel